Lieutenant-General Sir Brydges Trecothic Henniker, 1st Baronet (10 November 1767 - 3 July 1816) was a politician and British Army officer.

Henniker was the youngest son of John Henniker, 1st Baron Henniker and Anne Major, daughter of Sir John Major, 1st Baronet.

He sat in the Irish House of Commons as the Member of Parliament for Kildare Borough between 1797 and the constituency's disenfranchisement under the Acts of Union 1800. On 2 November 1813 he was created a baronet, of Newton Hall in the County of Essex in the Baronetage of the United Kingdom.

He gained the rank of lieutenant-general while serving in the British Army.

On 25 September 1791 he married Mary Pressy. Upon his death he was succeeded in his title by his eldest son, Sir Frederick Henniker, 2nd Baronet.

References

1767 births
1816 deaths
Irish MPs 1798–1800
Members of the Parliament of Ireland (pre-1801) for County Kildare constituencies
Baronets in the Baronetage of the United Kingdom
British Army lieutenant generals
Younger sons of barons